Michael Lee (19 October 1935 – 12 September 2012) was a Zimbabwean cricketer. He played first-class cricket for Rhodesia and Western Province between 1957 and 1960.

References

External links
 

1935 births
2012 deaths
Zimbabwean cricketers
Rhodesia cricketers
Western Province cricketers
People from Tolworth
Sportspeople from Surrey